Antoine-Joseph Yvon Villarceau (15 January 1813 – 23 December 1883) was a French astronomer, mathematician, and engineer.

He constructed an equatorial meridian-instrument and an isochronometric regulator for the Paris Observatory.

He wrote Mécanique Céleste. Expose des Méthodes de Wronski et Composantes des Forces Perturbatrices suivant les Axes Mobiles (Paris:  Gauthier-Villars, 1881) and Sur l'établissement des arches de pont, envisagé au point de vue de la plus grande stabilité (Paris: Imprimerie Impériale, 1853).

He is the eponym of Villarceau circles, which are two circular sections of a torus other than the two trivial ones.

A short street in the 16th arrondissement of Paris is named after Villarceau.

References

19th-century French astronomers
19th-century French mathematicians
1813 births
1883 deaths
People from Vendôme